The Church of Our Lady of Lourdes (OLL) is a church located on Jalan Tengku Kelana, Klang, Malaysia. Built in 1928, the current parish priest is Rev Fr Jude Gregory Chan and is assisted by Rev Fr Ferdinand Magimay. The church had celebrated its Golden Jubilee in 2008 after the church building had undergone some restoration and repainting works. Additionally, a new four-storey formation centre, named Wisma Lourdes, had been added to the church's complex in order to meet the increasing number of students and classes needed for Sunday School. Wisma Lourdes also houses the parochial house. Adjacent to the church is the Convent of the Holy Infant Jesus, which had also been built by 1928 for the Sisters of the Infant Jesus who conducted a school in Kuala Lumper - Convent Bukit Nanas - and were keen to conduct a similar private missionary school for girls in Klang.

Attractions

Annual Novena Feast Celebration 
The annual novena (translation: nine-day) feast celebration of Our Lady of Lourdes tends to attract thousands of Catholic pilgrims to the church, particularly in the month of February with the celebration of the World Day of the Sick on 11 February as instituted by Pope Saint John Paul II on 13 May 1992.The annual novena feast celebration is usually culminated with an outdoor procession, drawing hundreds of faithful with a missional goal by way of a communal participation.

Relic of St Maria Goretti 
On 8 February 2015, a first-class relic of St Maria Goretti was placed by Archbishop of Kuala Lumpur, Julian Leow, within the altar of the church and was witnessed by 1,300 congregants.

Glass Panes Depicting the images of the Blessed Virgin Mary and the Lord Jesus Christ 
In 2012, two glass panes believed to showcase images of the Virgin Mary and the face of Jesus were moved to the church from the Sime Darby Medical Centre in Subang Jaya (SJMC). These panes are available for viewing from 9:00 a.m. to 5:00 p.m. daily.

See also 
Christianity in Malaysia

References 

Klang (city)
Roman Catholic churches in Selangor